Exoprosopa brevirostris is a species of bee flies in the family Bombyliidae.

References

Further reading

 Diptera.info
 

Bombyliidae
Insects described in 1901